The Ulster Scots eXperience group including John Trotter formed in July 2005 as a break away from the Ulster-Scots Folk Orchestra.

They are a Northern Irish band of musicians who perform music from the Ulster-Scots tradition. They are part of a wider revival of interest in Ulster-Scots language and culture that developed during the 1990s. They draw on long established practices of community music making, including gospel-singing, fiddling, piping, flute and accordion bands, drumming and fifing. Combining these traditions in innovative ways, they produce sounds that are both new and distinctive. Their focus on the local is complemented by the creative use of related traditions in Scotland, Ireland and the Scots-Irish diaspora in North America.

External links
Ulster-Scots eXperience Video clips
Ulster-Scots experience official site
Ulster-Scots Folk Orchestra official site

Musical groups from Northern Ireland